Shane O'Neill may refer to:
 Shane O'Neill (Irish chieftain) (c. 1530–1567), head of the O'Neill clan of Ulster who fought the forces of Queen Elizabeth I
 Shane O'Neill (hurler) (born 1986), Irish  hurler
 João O'Neill (died 1788), also known as Shane O'Neill, head of the Clanaby O'Neill dynasty
 Shane O'Neill (tattoo artist) (born 1972), American tattoo artist
 Shane O'Neill (Irish exile) (1599–1641), youngest son of Hugh O'Neill, Earl of Tyrone
 Shane O'Neill (soccer) (born 1993), American soccer player
 Shane O'Neill (skateboarder) (born 1990), Australian professional skateboarder
 Shane O'Neill, 3rd Baron O'Neill (1907–1944), Anglo-Irish peer and British Army officer